This is a list of cathedrals in the state of Florida, United States:

See also
List of cathedrals in the United States

References

 Florida
Cathedrals in Florida
Florida
Cathedrals